Robert Ian "Bob" Wardle (born 5 March 1955) is an English former footballer, who played as a goalkeeper.

Career

Wardle started his career at Bristol City, however he didn't play a professional game before moving to Shrewsbury Town.

At Shrewsbury, he would make 131 appearances in his eight years there, earning him a move to Liverpool, with Steve Ogrizovic going to Shrewbury in exchange.

However, he didn't make a first team appearance at Liverpool, with Bruce Grobbelaar being their first choice goalkeeper. He was loaned out to Wrexham and Tranmere Rovers before being forced to retire due to an eye injury.

A testimonial match in his honour was held in 1986 where his former clubs Liverpool and Shrewsbury played one another.

References

1955 births
Living people
English footballers
Association football goalkeepers
English Football League players
Bristol City F.C. players
Shrewsbury Town F.C. players
Liverpool F.C. players
Wrexham A.F.C. players
Tranmere Rovers F.C. players
Footballers from Halifax, West Yorkshire